Central Trust Company is a building located in Camden, Camden County, New Jersey, United States. It was built in 1899 and was added to the National Register of Historic Places on January 5, 2005.

See also
National Register of Historic Places listings in Camden County, New Jersey

References

Commercial buildings on the National Register of Historic Places in New Jersey
Commercial buildings completed in 1899
Buildings and structures in Camden, New Jersey
National Register of Historic Places in Camden County, New Jersey
1899 establishments in New Jersey
New Jersey Register of Historic Places
Bank buildings on the National Register of Historic Places in New Jersey